Erhardt is a surname, and may refer to:

Anke Ehrhardt, researcher on gender, sexual development and HIV
Bruna Erhardt (born 1988), Brazilian fashion model
Carl Erhardt (1897–1988), English Olympic ice hockey player
Christopher Erhardt (born 1950s), American video gamer producer
Friedman Paul Erhardt (1943–2007), German-American television chef known as Chef Tell
Heinz Erhardt (1909–1979), German comedian and actor
Herbert Erhardt (born 1930), German professional football player
Hermann Ehrhardt (1881–1971), German army officer and naval officer
Joel Erhardt (1838-1909), American police commissioner of New York City
Doctor Laurence Erhardt, a character on the television series Mystery Science Theater 3000
Paul Ehrhardt (1888-1981), German painter
Ron Erhardt (politician) (born 1930), American politician from Minnesota; state legislator
Ron Erhardt (born 1932), American professional football coach
Tom Erhardt (1928–2019),  American-born British theatrical literary agent
Trevor Erhardt (born 1962), Canadian ice hockey player

typeface
Ehrhardt (typeface), Monotype series 453, typeface

See also
Erhardt Island, Nunavut, Canada
Erhard (disambiguation)
Erhart
Ehrhardt (disambiguation)